Artur Guttmann (27 August 1891 in Vienna – 3 September 1945 in Hollywood, Los Angeles) was an Austrian-Jewish film score composer.

Selected filmography

Bibliography
 Prawer, S.S. Between Two Worlds: The Jewish Presence in German and Austrian Film, 1910-1933. Berghahn Books, 2007.

References

External links

1891 births
1945 deaths
Austrian male composers
Austrian composers
Austrian film score composers
Male film score composers
Austrian Jews
Musicians from Vienna
20th-century Austrian composers
20th-century Austrian male musicians